Portsmouth is an independent city in southeast Virginia, United States. It lies across the Elizabeth River from Norfolk. As of the 2020 census, the population was 97,915. It's the 9th most populous city in Virginia and is part of the Hampton Roads metropolitan area.

The Norfolk Naval Shipyard is a historic and active U.S. Navy facility located in Portsmouth.

History 

In 1620, the future site of Portsmouth was recognized as a suitable shipbuilding location by John Wood, a shipbuilder, who petitioned King James I of England for a land grant. The surrounding area was soon settled as a plantation community.

Portsmouth was founded by Colonel William Crawford, a member of the Virginia House of Burgesses. It was established as a town in 1752 by an act of the Virginia General Assembly and was named for Portsmouth, England.

In 1767, Andrew Sprowle, a shipbuilder, founded the Gosport Shipyard adjacent to Portsmouth. The Gosport Shipyard at Portsmouth was owned by the Commonwealth of Virginia after the American Revolutionary War and was sold to the new United States federal government.

In 1855, the Portsmouth and Norfolk area suffered an epidemic of yellow fever which killed 1 of every three citizens. It became an independent city from Norfolk County in 1858.

During the American Civil War, in 1861, Virginia joined the Confederate States of America. Fearing that the Confederacy would take control of the shipyard at Portsmouth, the shipyard commander ordered the burning of the shipyard. The Confederate forces did in fact take over the shipyard, and did so without armed conflict through an elaborate ruse orchestrated by civilian railroad builder William Mahone (soon to become a famous Confederate officer). The Union forces withdrew to Fort Monroe across Hampton Roads, which was the only land in the area which remained under Union control.

In early 1862, the Confederate ironclad warship CSS Virginia was rebuilt using the burned-out hulk of USS Merrimack. Virginia engaged the Union ironclad USS Monitor in the famous Battle of Hampton Roads during the Union blockade of Hampton Roads. The Confederates burned the shipyard again when they left in May 1862.

Following the recapture of Norfolk and Portsmouth by the Union forces, the name of the shipyard was changed to Norfolk Naval Shipyard. The name of the shipyard was derived from its location in Norfolk County. The Norfolk Naval Shipyard today is located entirely within the city limits of Portsmouth, Virginia. The Norfolk Naval Shipyard name has been retained to minimize any confusion with the Portsmouth Naval Shipyard, which itself is actually located in Kittery, Maine, across the Piscataqua River from Portsmouth, New Hampshire.

During and after World War II, the shipyard flourished and suburban development surrounded both Norfolk and Portsmouth. Portsmouth continued as the county seat of Norfolk County until 1963 when the new city of Chesapeake was formed in a political consolidation with the city of South Norfolk. Portsmouth's other county neighbor, the former Nansemond County, also consolidated with a smaller city, forming the new city of Suffolk in 1974.
One of the older cities of Hampton Roads, in the early 21st century, Portsmouth was undergoing moderate urban renewal in the downtown.

The APM "MAERSK" marine terminal for container ships opened in 2007 in the West Norfolk section.

Timeline

 1752 - Portsmouth founded by politician William Crawford; named after Portsmouth, England.
 1779 - Portsmouth sacked by British forces during the American Revolutionary War.
 1812 - Dismal Swamp Canal opens.
 1821 - Fire.
 1822 - Norfolk-Portsmouth steam ferry begins operating.
 1824 - October 25: Lafayette visits Portsmouth.
 1836 - Town of Portsmouth incorporated.
 1837 - Portsmouth & Roanoke Railroad begins operating.
 1840 - Population: 6,477.
 1846 - Norfolk County Courthouse built.
 1850 - Population: 8,626.
 1855 - Yellow fever outbreak.
 1858 - City of Portsmouth incorporated as an independent city (separated from Norfolk County).
 1865 - Zion Baptist Church founded.
 1867 - Virginia Baptist State Convention organized during a meeting in Portsmouth.
 1870 - Population: 10,590.
 1890 - Became a stop on the Atlantic and Danville Railway. 
 1894 - Annexation of portions of Norfolk County North of the city
 1900 - Lyceum Theatre in business.
 1910 - Population: 33,190.
 1909 – Annexation of portions of Norfolk County West of the city. 
 1914 - Portsmouth Public Library opens.
 1919 – Expansion via the annexation of parts of Norfolk County that included the port zone (Pinner's Point) along the Elizbeth River to the north and residential areas to the West. 
 1922 - Chevra Thilim Synagogue built.
 1939 - Lyric Theatre in business.
 1948 – The fourth annexation since becoming an independent city, pushing the city boundary westward to Western Branch.
 1949 - Portsmouth Naval Shipyard Museum established.
 1950 - Population: 80,039.
 1952 - Downtown Tunnel opens.
 1955 - Portsmouth Historical Association founded.
 1957 - WAVY-TV begins broadcasting.
 1960 - Population: 114,773. Portsmouth annexes additional portions of Norfolk County, including ten square miles and 36,000 residents. 
 1963 - Public Library's "Local History Room" established.
 1966 - Virginia Sports Hall of Fame and Museum established.
 1968 – Further annexation of Norfolk County including ten square miles of land, 14 square miles of water area, and 11,000 residents, all within the norther one-third of Western Branch Borough.
 1974 - Richard Joseph Davis becomes mayor.
 1981 - Portsmouth Times newspaper begins publication.
 1984 - James W. Holley III becomes mayor.
 1993 - Bobby Scott becomes U.S. representative for Virginia's 3rd congressional district.
 1998 - Museum of Military History established.
 2001 - Randy Forbes becomes U.S. representative for Virginia's 4th congressional district.
 2010 - Population: 95,535.
 2017 - John L. Rowe, Jr. becomes mayor.

Historic sites

Olde Towne
The Olde Towne Historic District features one of the largest collections of historically significant homes between Alexandria, Virginia and Charleston, South Carolina.  The Emanuel African Methodist Episcopal Church was built by slaves and free men and is the second-oldest building in Portsmouth and the city's oldest black church.

The city contains a number of other historic buildings, as well, including the Pass House, which was built in 1841 by Judge James Murdaugh and occupied by Union troops from 1862 to 1865. Federal forces required Portsmouth residents to obtain a written pass to travel across the Elizabeth River and beyond. These passes were issued from the English basement and thus the name "Pass House" was derived.

Naval Medical Center Portsmouth
Formerly the Naval Hospital Portsmouth, the Naval Medical Center Portsmouth is a United States Navy medical center adjacent to the Olde Towne Historic District and Park View Historic District. Founded in 1827, it is the oldest continuously running hospital in the Navy medical system with the motto "First and Finest."

Seaboard Coastline Building 
Located at 1 High Street in the Olde Towne Historic District, the Seaboard Coastline Building is a historic train station and former headquarters of the Seaboard Air Line railroad company.

The Hill House
A four-story 1825 English basement home furnished entirely with original family belongings. It is evident from the furnishings that the Hill family were avid collectors and lived graciously over a period of 150 years. The house remains in its original condition, with limited renovation through the years.

Cedar Grove Cemetery
Established in 1832, Cedar Grove Cemetery is the oldest city-owned cemetery in Portsmouth. Listed on the National Register of Historic Places listings in Portsmouth, Virginia, the cemetery is noted for its funerary art and the civic, business, maritime, religious and military leaders who are buried there. Historical markers placed throughout the cemetery allow for self-guided tours. The cemetery is located between Effingham Street and Fort Lane in Olde Towne Portsmouth. Entrance is through the south gate to the cemetery, located on London Boulevard.

Geography

The city is also bisected by the West Branch of the Elizabeth River which flows from neighboring Suffolk.

Climate
Portsmouth's mild humid subtropical climate means outdoor activities can be enjoyed year round. The weather in Portsmouth is temperate and seasonal. Summers are hot and humid with warm evenings. No measurable snow fell in 1999. The wettest seasons are the spring and summer, although rainfall is fairly constant all year round. The highest recorded temperature was 105.0 °F in 1980. The lowest recorded temperature was -3.0 °F on January 21, 1985.

Additionally, the geographic location of the city, with respect to the principal storm tracks, is especially favorable, as it is south of the average path of storms originating in the higher latitudes, and north of the usual tracks of hurricanes and other major tropical storms.

Demographics

2020 census

Note: the US Census treats Hispanic/Latino as an ethnic category. This table excludes Latinos from the racial categories and assigns them to a separate category. Hispanics/Latinos can be of any race.

2010 census

As of the 2010 census, there were 95,535 people, 38,170 households, and 25,497 families residing in the city. The population density was 3,032.7 people per square mile (1,170.9/km2). There were 41,605 housing units at an average density of 1,254.7 per square mile (484.4/km2). The racial makeup of the city was 53.3% African American, 41.6% White, 0.4% Native American, 1.1% Asian, 0.1% Pacific Islander, 1.0% from other races, and 2.6% from two or more races. Hispanic or Latino of any race were 3.1% of the population.

There were 38,170 households, out of which 30.6% had children under the age of 18 living with them, 41.1% were married couples living together, 10.9% have a female household with no husband present and 33.2% were non-families. 27.5% of all households were made up of individuals, and 10.8% had someone living alone who was 65 years of age or older. The average household size was 2.51 and the average family size was 3.05.

In the city, the population was spread out, with 25.7% under the age of 18, 11.1% from 18 to 24, 29.1% from 25 to 44, 20.3% from 45 to 64, and 13.8% who were 65 years of age or older. The median age was 34 years. For every 100 females, there were 93.5 males. For every 100 females age 18 and over, there were 90.6 males.

The median income for a household in the city was $46,340, and the median income for a family was $53,769. Males had a median income of $39,871 versus $33,140 for females. The per capita income for the city was $23,108. About 13.5% of families and 16.7% of the population were below the poverty line, including 27.1% of those under age 18 and 10.8% of those age 65 or over.

Arts and culture

Tourism
Portsmouth has a long history as a port town and city. The Olde Towne Business and Historical District is located in the downtown area, where a combination of preservation and redevelopment has been underway. An example is Hawthorn Hotel & Suites at The Governor Dinwiddie Hotel, which was renovated and reopened in 2005 after being closed for more than 10 years. It has been recognized by Historic Hotels of America, a program of the National Trust for Historical Preservation that identifies hotels that have maintained their historical integrity, architecture and ambiance and provides resources for their preservation. The historic hotel was named for Governor Robert Dinwiddie, who was the administrative head of the Colony of Virginia during the time Portsmouth was founded in 1752. It was largely through his efforts that Virginia survived the French and Indian War relatively well. (Dinwiddie County near Petersburg was also named for him).

Other points of interest include the Portsmouth City Park, featuring the  narrow gauge Portsmouth City Railroad with an operating Chance Rides C.P. Huntington locomotive named Pokey Smokey II.  The original Pokey Smokey locomotive was built by Crown Metal Products and ran at the park for many years before being sold at auction.  It now runs on the Mideast Railroad in Ederville in Carthage, North Carolina.

In addition, the Railroad Museum of Virginia located at Harbor Center Way features vintage railroad artifacts, rolling stock, and an operating model train layout.

Sports
The Portsmouth Cavaliers were a basketball team founded in 2010 and played in the American Basketball Association for the 2011–12 season. Based in Portsmouth, Virginia, the Cavaliers played their home games at the Chick-fil-A Fieldhouse on the campus of Portsmouth Catholic Regional School. The club spent one season in the American Professional Basketball League (APBL) before folding.

Each April since 1953, the city hosts the Portsmouth Invitational Tournament, where college basketball seniors play in front of scouts from the NBA and top European leagues.  Many top basketball stars played in the PIT before successful pro careers, including Jimmy Butler, Scottie Pippen, Dennis Rodman, and John Stockton.

Government

Portsmouth is governed under the Council-Manager form of government. The current mayor is Navy veteran and businessman Shannon Glover. The City Hall Building, located at 801 Crawford Street, is the regular meeting place of the City Council of The City of Portsmouth, Virginia. The City Council is a legislative body served by six members, elected for four-year terms.

 John S. White, 1852-1853
 Hezekiah Stoakes, 1854
 D. D. Fiske, 1855
 James G. Hodges, 1856-1857
 George W. Grice, 1858-1860
 John O. Lawrence, 1861
 John Nash, 1862
 Daniel Collins, 1863-1865
 James C. White, 1866
 James E. Stoakes, 1868
 E. W. Whipple, 1869
 Philip G. Thomas, 1870-1871
 A. S. Watts, 1872-1874
 John O'Connor, 1876-1877
 John Thompson Baird, 1878-1894
 L.H. Davis, 1894-1896
 John Thompson Baird, circa 1896-1902
 ?
 Jack P. Barnes, circa 1973
 Richard Joseph Davis, 1974-1980
 Julian E. Johansen, circa 1980-1983
 James W. Holley III, 1984-1987
 Gloria Webb, 1987-1996
 James W. Holley III, 1996-2010
 Kenneth I. Wright, 2010-2017
 John Rowe, 2017–present

Law enforcement
The Portsmouth Police Department has about 255 sworn law enforcement officers and 380 total employees.

In May 2019, Police Chief Tonya Chapman resigned from her position. She was replaced by Angela Greene who serves as interim chief.

Ten Portsmouth policemen have died in the line of duty, the first in 1871. Four of these died from gunshot wounds.

Crime
Crime in the city is much higher than elsewhere in Virginia or the United States generally.

Education

Primary and secondary schools
Portsmouth Public Schools operates public schools. There are three public high schools in Portsmouth, Virginia, located at three corners of the city. In the northwest section of the city, off Cedar Lane, is Churchland High School. In the downtown section of the city, between London Blvd and High Street, is I.C. Norcom High School. In the southwest section of Portsmouth, on Elmhurst Lane, is Manor High School.

Higher education
There are a number of institutions of higher education in and in close proximity to Portsmouth. The city is home to the Tri-Cities Higher Education Center of Old Dominion University (ODU), a public research university founded in 1930 whose main campus is located in Norfolk, Virginia. Portsmouth is also home to the Fred W. Beazley Portsmouth Campus of Tidewater Community College, a two-year higher education institution founded in 1968 in South Hampton Roads with additional campuses located in Chesapeake, Norfolk, and Virginia Beach. Angelos Bible College was established in 1984.

Media
Portsmouth's daily newspaper is the Virginian-Pilot with The Currents being the Portsmouth edition of the Sunday paper. Other papers include the New Journal and Guide, and Inside Business. Hampton Roads Magazine serves as a bi-monthly regional magazine for Portsmouth and the Hampton Roads area. The Hampton Roads Times serves as an online magazine for all the Hampton Roads cities and counties. Portsmouth is served by a variety of radio stations on the AM and FM dials, with towers located around the Hampton Roads area.

Portsmouth is also served by several television stations. The Hampton Roads designated market area (DMA) is the 42nd largest in the U.S. with 712,790 homes (0.64% of the total U.S.). The major network television affiliates are WTKR-TV 3 (CBS), WAVY 10 (NBC), WVEC-TV 13 (ABC), WGNT 27 (CW), WTVZ 33 (MyNetworkTV), WVBT 43 (Fox), and WPXV 49 (ION Television). The Public Broadcasting Service stations are WHRO-TV 15, Hampton/Norfolk and WUND-TV 2, Edenton, NC. Portsmouth residents also can receive independent stations, such as WSKY broadcasting on channel 4 from the Outer Banks of North Carolina and WGBS-LD broadcasting on channel 11 from Hampton. Portsmouth is served by Cox Cable and Verizon FIOS. DirecTV and Dish Network are also popular as an alternative to cable television in Portsmouth. WAVY-TV and WVBT-TV are both sister stations owned by Nexstar and have their office and studio located in the city.

Infrastructure

Transportation

From the earliest development, Portsmouth has been oriented to the water. In the 1830s, it was the first community in Hampton Roads to receive a new land transportation innovation, railroad service. The Portsmouth and Roanoke Railroad, a predecessor of the Seaboard Air Line Railroad, extended to the rapids of the Roanoke River on its fall line near Weldon, North Carolina. It was to be 20 more years before its bigger neighbor, the city of Norfolk, also received a rail line, in 1858, when the Norfolk and Petersburg Railroad was completed. The Atlantic Coast Line Railroad operated passenger trains #36 and #5 to and from its North Portsmouth Station to Rocky Mount, North Carolina until 1954. In earlier years ACL ran trains including the Tar Heel all the way south to Wilmington, North Carolina. 

From Seaboard Terminal the Seaboard Air Line and then the Seaboard Coast Line Railroad operated #17 and #18 to and from Raleigh, North Carolina, where the train joined with those companies' Silver Comet. The SAL also operated a local all-coach train (#3-11 southbound/#6-10 northbound) to Atlanta from the terminal. The 17/18 trains ended in 1968. 

Portsmouth is primarily served by the Norfolk International Airport , now the region's major commercial airport. The airport is located near Chesapeake Bay, along the city limits of neighboring Norfolk and Virginia Beach. Seven airlines provide nonstop services to twenty-five destinations. ORF had 3,703,664 passengers take off or land at its facility and 68,778,934 pounds of cargo were processed through its facilities. Newport News/Williamsburg International Airport  also provides commercial air service for the Hampton Roads area. The Chesapeake Regional Airport provides general aviation services and is located five miles (8 km) outside the city limits.

In the 21st century, the city has access to lines of CSX Transportation, Norfolk Southern and three short line railroads. Amtrak provides service to points along the Northeast Corridor from Newport News station across the Hampton Roads, and from Norfolk station across the Elizabeth River.

Portsmouth is served by Interstate 264 and Interstate 664, which is part of the Hampton Roads Beltway. U.S. Route 17 and U.S. Route 58 pass through. The Elizabeth River is crossed via the Midtown Tunnel, the Downtown Tunnel and Berkley Bridge combination.

Transportation within the city, as well as the other cities of Hampton Roads, is served by a regional bus service, Hampton Roads Transit.

Notable people

 V. C. Andrews (1923-1986), bestselling novelist 
 James P. Berkeley (1907-1985), USMC general and expert in Military communications
 Marty Brennaman (1942-), long-time Cincinnati Reds radio broadcaster
 Ruth Brown (1928-2006), R&B singer and actress
 Bebe Buell (1953-), Playboy Playmate, fashion model, singer, mother of Liv Tyler
 John T. Casteen III (1943-), President of the University of Virginia, born in Portsmouth
 Deborah Coleman (1956–2018), blues musician
 Fanny Murdaugh Downing (1831-1894), author and poet
 Jamin Elliott (1979-), former NFL wide receiver with the Chicago Bears, New England Patriots, and Atlanta Falcons
 Missy Elliott (1971-), recording artist, award-winning producer, singer-songwriter, dancer, actress and clothing line designer
 Perry Ellis (1940-1986), fashion designer, founded a sportswear house in the mid-1970s
 Dorian Finney-Smith (1993-), Professional basketball player for the Dallas Mavericks
 Mordechai Gifter (1915-2001), among the foremost American religious leaders of Orthodox Jewry in the late 20th century
 Melvin Gregg (1988-), American actor and model
 Chandler Harper, (1914-2004), winner of the 1950 PGA golf championship
 Ken Hatfield, classical guitarist
 James W. Holley III (1926-2012), politician, first African-American mayor of any city in the Hampton Roads region (Portsmouth)
 W. Nathaniel "Nat" Howell (1939-2020), State Dept. Foreign Service officer, former Ambassador to Kuwait; Professor emeritus, the University of Virginia
 Chad Hugo  (1974-), American record producer and songwriter
 Ben Jones (1941-), actor "Cooter" on The Dukes of Hazzard; U.S. Congressman, moved to Portsmouth as a child
 Jillian Kesner-Graver (1949-2007), actress
 Jack T. Kirby (1938-2009), historian of the southern United States, awarded the Bancroft Prize for his 2006 book Mockingbird Song: Ecological Landscapes of the South
 Erik S. Kristensen (1972-2005), US Navy SEAL  Lieutenant Commander and highest decorated SEAL to be killed in Operation Red Wings
 Rita Lavelle (1947–), assistant administrator of the U.S. Environmental Protection Agency 
 Nathan McCall (1955-), African-American author who grew up in the Cavalier Manor section of Portsmouth, Virginia
 Pete Mikolajewski (1943-), football player
 James Murphy (1967-), metal guitarist, member of the bands Death, Testament, Obituary and Disincarnate
 Wendell Cushing Neville (1870-1930), 14th Commandant of the U.S. Marine Corps
 Tommy Newsom (1929-2007), assistant bandleader for the Johnny Carson Band
 Patton Oswalt (1969-), writer, stand-up comedian, and actor
 John L. Porter (1813-1893), President of the first City Council, a naval constructor for United States Navy and the Confederate States Navy.
 Dave Robertson (1889-1970), MLB outfielder 1912–22, played in World Series for New York Giants; born in Portsmouth
 William Russ (1950-), actor
 Dave Smith (1942-), poet, novelist
 Wanda Sykes (1964-), writer, stand-up comedian, and actress
 Ted Thomas, Sr. (1935-2020), Pentecostal African-American preacher, pastor of New Community Temple Church of God in Christ
 Mike Watt (1957-), bassist, singer and songwriter
 Nicole Wray(1979-), R&B singer and songwriter

Sister cities
  Portsmouth, United Kingdom
  Dunedin, New Zealand
  Orizaba, Veracruz, Mexico
  Eldoret, Kenya
  Goree Island, Senegal

See also

 National Register of Historic Places listings in Portsmouth, Virginia

Notes

References

Bibliography

 
 
 
 
 
 
 
 
 
 
  circa 1916-

External links

 City of Portsmouth municipal website
 Portsmouth city directories, 19th-20th c. (via Norfolk Public Library)
 
 Items related to Portsmouth, Virginia, various dates (via Digital Public Library of America)

 
Cities in Virginia
1752 establishments in Virginia
Populated places in Hampton Roads
Black Belt (U.S. region)
Majority-minority counties and independent cities in Virginia